Between 7 and 9 May 2017 at least 136 civilians were killed in series of reprisal killings by Anti-balaka and UPC fighters.

Events 
The clashes were triggered by arrest of two young boys by Muslim combatants who were accused of being part of self-defense group. Anti-balaka militias in response kidnapped family of a Séléka member to pressure group to release the boys. On 7 May shootout started between both groups. On 9 May UPC supported by local Muslims attacked Paris-Congo and Banguiville neighborhoods in Alindao. They conducted door-to-door searches, looking for men to kill and women and girls to rape. Human Rights Watch documented 12 cases of rape by UPC fighters in Alindao in May 2017. One woman described as fighters raped her and her husband and then murdered her husband and daughter with gunshots. Local UPC fighters were led by Ali Darassa. Bruno Bagaza, a Red Cross volunteer was killed by UPC fighters while wearing his uniform.

As UPC fighters managed to repel Anti-balaka attack on the town on 9 May, Anti-balaka fighters withdrew towards Mingala. According to unconfirmed reports around 10 churches were destroyed or looted in the surrounding villages as the rebels retreated.

Casualties 
At least 136 people were killed. Some bodies were thrown into the wells. At least 19 of them (including an imam) were killed by Anti-balakas while at least 37 of them were killed by UPC fighters. At least 110 people were injured. ​14,382 people reportedly took shelter at local Catholic mission. 329 houses had been burnt down.

References 

Central African Republic Civil War
May 2017 events in Africa
2017 in the Central African Republic
Massacres in the Central African Republic
Massacres in 2017